Kareem Javier Valentine Sandoval (born 11 October 1992) is an Antiguan swimmer. He competed at the 2008 Summer Olympics.

External links 
Caribbean swimmer relishes his 31.23 seconds in the Olympic spotlight

Living people
Swimmers at the 2008 Summer Olympics
Olympic swimmers of Antigua and Barbuda
Antigua and Barbuda male swimmers
1992 births
Swimmers at the 2010 Summer Youth Olympics
Place of birth missing (living people)